Đống Đa (literally Banyan Heap) is one of the four original urban districts (quận) of Hanoi, the capital city of Vietnam. It is bordered by Ba Đình to the north, Hoàn Kiếm to the northeast, Hai Bà Trưng to the east, Thanh Xuân to the south, and Cầu Giấy to the west. The district currently has 21 wards, covering a total area of 9.95 square kilometers. It is the most populous district in Hanoi. As of 2017, there were 420900 people residing in the district, the population density is 42302 inhabitants per square kilometer, 18 times higher than the overall density of Hanoi. Dong Da district is home to various enterprises and many of Vietnam's most prestigious universities such as Hanoi Medical University, Foreign Trade University, University of Transport and Communications, Thuyloi University.

Dong Da district has a large number of monuments and relics, including Temple of Literature (Văn Miếu), a cultural symbol of the city. The district is also where the Battle of Ngọc Hồi-Đống Đa between Tây Sơn dynasty and the Qing dynasty, one of the greatest victories in Vietnamese military history, ended.

Geography

Đống Đa is located at 21°00' North, 105°49' East, in the center of Hanoi. Of the land in Đống Đa, or 50.3% is specially used land, while , or 43.8%, is used for residential purposes.

Đống Đa has relatively flat terrain, with only a few small mounds in the eastern parts, including Đống Đa Mound.

Lakes

There are several large lakes such as Ba Mau lake, Kim Lien lake, Xa Dan lake, Dong Da lake, Van Chuong lake. In the past, there used to be many ponds and lagoons; however; but due to social-economic development and urbanization, the number of them has been reduced, with many being filled or polluted.

 Ba Mau Lake
 Dong Da Lake
 Hao Nam Lake, near Cát Linh station of Line 2A, Hanoi Metro
 Nam Dong Lake
 Van Chuong Lake
 Linh Quang Lake
 Khuong Thuong Lake
 Ho Me Lake, located at the corner of the street Ton That Tung - Truong Chinh, next to the Hanoi Medical University
 Lang Lake
 Kim Lien Lake

Administrative divisions
The district is divided into 21 wards (phường).

Economy

As of 2015, there are 11169 acting enterprises, cooperatives, and 11133 non-farm individual business establishments in the district. Several of Vietnam's largest companies, such as Petrolimex, Vinacomin, Vietnam Posts and Telecommunications Group, Vietnam Steel Corporation and VPBank, are headquartered in this district.

Landmarks

 Hanoi station
 Temple of Literature
 Đống Đa Mound
 Boc Pagoda
 Phuc Khanh Pagoda
 Láng Pagoda
 Thong Nhat Park (Lenin Park)
 Hoang Cao Khai's tomb

Education

Colleges and universities

 University of Transport and Communications
 Vietnam Trade Union University
 Hanoi Law University
 Foreign Trade University
 Thuyloi University
 Hanoi Medical University
 Diplomatic Academy of Vietnam
 Banking Academy of Vietnam
 Hanoi University of Industrial Fine Arts
 Hanoi University of Culture
 Vietnam National Academy of Music
 National Academy of Public Administration (Vietnam)
 Vietnam Women's Academy
 Vietnam Youth Academy

Health care and other facilities

Some medical facilities in Dong Da:
 Bạch Mai Hospital
 Vietnam National Hospital of Acupuncture
 Hôpital Français de Hanoi
 Vietnam National Hospital of Pediatrics
 Hanoi Medical University Hospital
 National Otorhinorarynology Hospital of Vietnam
 National Hospital of Endocrinology 
 National Hospital of Dermatology and Venereology

Sports 
Hàng Đẫy Stadium, also known as Hanoi Stadium, is situated in Dong Da district. The stadium holds 22,500 spectators, currently used mostly for football matches. Since the 2009 season, all four of the football clubs in Hanoi – Hanoi FC, Thể Công, Hòa Phát Hà Nội, and Hà Nội ACB – have chosen the stadium as their home ground.

Shopping 
Đặng Văn Ngữ Street

Đông Các Street

Đông Tác SecondHand Market

Chùa Bộc Street

Chùa Láng Street

See also
 Đống Đa Mound
 Temple of Literature

References

Districts of Hanoi